Lee Sung-ho (born 9 July 1992) is a judoka from South Korea

Lee Sung-Ho has competed at judoka and won numerous prizes. He secured bronze at the Grand Prix of Jeju in 2015. He claimed silver at the Grand Slam in Tokyo in 2017. He was awarded a bronze medal at the Asian Pacific Championships in Fujairah in 2019. He also won a bronze medal at the gold Grand Prix in Hohhot in 2019. He clinched a bronze medal at the World Military Games in Wuhan in 2019. He then also claimed a bronze medal at the Grand Slam in Kazan in 2021. He was selected to compete in the Judo at the 2020 Summer Olympics – Men's 81 kg.

References

External links
 

Living people
1992 births
South Korean male judoka
Olympic judoka of South Korea
Judoka at the 2020 Summer Olympics